C. Quintana (also known as CQ and previously known as Christina Quintana) is a Cuban-American playwright, poet, and writer. Her works have been published in literary journals and produced across the United States. The Heart Wants, her chapbook of poetry, was published in 2016 by Finishing Line Press.

Education and career 
Quintana attended Ursuline Academy New Orleans and the New Orleans Center for Creative Arts, a performing-arts high school. She graduated from College of Santa Fe in 2010 with a degree in theatre and a minor in creative writing. Under the guidance of Charles Mee, she earned an MFA in Playwriting from Columbia University School of the Arts.

Quintana is the founder of QuintanaTown Consulting, a writing consultancy for scripts, college and graduate school essays, and cover letters. She founded the Live Lunch Series in 2014, a project aiming to bring theatre to workplaces during lunch. The project premiered at the Andrew W. Mellon Foundation and expanded to The Fortune Society, an organization that helps previously incarcerated people integrate into society.

Much of her writing revolves around themes of injustice, loss, queerness, and marginalized identities. At her website, she self-identifies as "a queer writer with Cuban and Louisiana roots," and says she "tells stories that mine the misconception of dissimilarity and proclaim, 'You are not alone.'"

Personal life 
Quintana, who identifies at nonbinary and gender non-conforming, changed their first name from Christina to C. in 2022. She also goes by CQ.

Awards 
Quintana is the recipient of numerous awards and fellowships for her writing:

 2014 Lambda Literary Emerging Voices Fellow in Fiction 
 2017 Van Lier New Voices Fellowship
 2017 Arch & Bruce Brown Playwriting Competition – Honorable Mention: Azul
 2017-18 New York's Playwrights Realm writing fellowship recipient 
 2018 MacDowell Colony Fellowship

Plays 

Enter Your Sleep (2012): Productions with Elm Theatre New Orleans, Baby Crow Productions, and Yale Cabaret
Blank Canvas (2014): Production (awarded "Best Short") in the 12th annual Downtown Urban Theater Festival
Scissoring (2014): World Premiere at INTAR (2018); staged reading (2014) at the Alliance Theatre
Three Thousand Seizures (2015): Semifinalist for Southern Rep Ruby Prize
Evensong (2016): World Premiere at Astoria Performing Arts Center
The Great Lonely Roamer & The Night that Changed Everything (2016): Workshop Production in NYU Voices Festival
Gumbo (2017) (with Music by Brett Macias): Selected by the Yale Institute for Music Theatre for their 2017 Summer Lab
 Azul (2017): Honorable Mention in the Arch and Bruce Brown Foundation playwriting competition
Citizen Scientist (2018): Public reading at the 2018 First Light Festival, hosted by the EST/Sloan Project (commission)
 Mr. San Man (2018): Studio Retreat and public readings at the Lark Theatre

References

External links

Living people
Year of birth missing (living people)
Columbia University School of the Arts alumni
American LGBT dramatists and playwrights
American writers of Cuban descent
21st-century American dramatists and playwrights
Santa Fe University of Art and Design alumni
MacDowell Colony fellows
21st-century LGBT people